Nicolas James Maddinson (born 21 December 1991) is an Australian cricketer. He is a left-handed opening batter who has represented Australia in both Test matches and Twenty20 Internationals. Domestically he plays for the Victoria cricket team and the Melbourne Renegades in the Big Bash League, previously having played for New South Wales, Melbourne Stars and Sydney Sixers.

Early life and cricket
Born on 21 December 1991 in Nowra, New South Wales, Maddinson was part of the New South Wales under-19 side that won the Australian under-19 Championship in December 2009. Two months earlier, he had topped the batting averages for Australia's under-19 side in a home series against Sri Lanka under-19s, averaging 72 runs and innings during the series, including scoring a century in one match. He was later selected for the Australian for the 2010 ICC Under-19 Cricket World Cup, opening the batting as Australia won the tournament.

Maddinson also enjoyed an excellent season for Sutherland District Cricket Club in 2009/10, scoring 604 runs at an average of 46.46 runs per innings. He scored two centuries, including making 137 runs in the semi-final against Eastern Suburbs Cricket Club, helping Sutherland reach the Grand Final, where they eventually lost to St George Cricket Club. he took 12 First Grade wickets during the season with his left-arm orthodox spin deliveries, including five wickets for 95 runs in the semi-final.

Domestic cricket career
Maddinson made his first-class cricket debut in October 2011, scoring a century to become the youngest New South Wales player to score a century on first-class debut. His score of 113 runs against South Australia at the Adelaide Oval came aged 18 years and 294 days, beaten the record set by Arthur Morris in 1940 aged 18 years and 342 days.

Maddinson made his Big Bash League debut for Sydney Sixers in January 2011 and played for the side until the 2017/18 season. During the 2014/15 season he captained the side in five matches when Moisés Henriques was injured, He made his Indian Premier League debut in 2014 for Royal Challengers Bangalore, playing in just two matches before being ruled out of the competition due to injury. He rejoined the side in 2015 but played only once before playing for Guyana Amazon Warriors in the 2016 Caribbean Premier League, finishing on the losing side in the competition's final. In 2018 he played for Surrey County Cricket Club in the 2018 Vitality Blast.

Maddinson moved to play for Victoria ahead of the 2018/19 Australian season. He found a place in the side in the 2018–19 JLT One-Day Cup, playing in all eight matches and scoring two half-centuries. He was left out of the first five matches of the Sheffield Shield season but selected following Marcus Harris' selection in the Australian Test squad for the tour of India. He scored 162 runs on his Victoria Shield debut, but later broke his arm during a match, ruling him out for the finals. At the same time he moved to play for Victorian side Melbourne Stars in the Big Bash.

In 2019/20 Maddinson was the leading run scorer in the Sheffield Shield, making 780 runs at an average of 86.66 runs an innings. He made two centuries and five half-centuries and set a new highest first-class score of 224 runs. He was awarded the joint Shield player of the year award.

International career
As a 19-year-old, Maddinson was selected in both the one-day and four-day Australia A squads for the 2011 tour of Zimbabwe, playing in three one-day matches in a tri-series with Zimbabwe and South Africa.

He went on to make his full international debut for Australia in a Twenty20 International match against India at Rajkot in October 2013, scoring 34 runs from 16 balls. In November 2016 Maddinson made his Test match debut in the third Test against the touring South Africans. His baggy green cap was presented by Simon Katich. He played in three Tests during the summer batting at number six, making a duck on debut against South Africa and then scores of 1, 4 and 22 in three innings against the touring Pakistan side before being dropped for the final Test of the summer.

References

External links
 

1991 births
Australia Test cricketers
Australia Twenty20 International cricketers
Australian cricketers
Cricketers from New South Wales
Living people
New South Wales cricketers
People from Nowra
Royal Challengers Bangalore cricketers
Sydney Sixers cricketers
Victoria cricketers
Melbourne Stars cricketers
Melbourne Renegades cricketers